The Iran Chamber of Commerce, Industries, Mines and Agriculture (ICCIMA) is a non-profit non-governmental institution, established to facilitate economic growth and development in the country. ICCIMA is a forum in the field of industries, mines and agriculture.

Duties

ICCIMA's main functions are:

facilitating cooperation among business persons and owners of industries, mines and agricultural units,
advising in the implementation of relevant state laws and regulations, 
providing advisory opinions to the Government on commercial and economic issues, 
establishing relations with chambers of commerce in other countries. As of 2010, Iran’s Chamber of Commerce had relations with 40 international chambers, 
establishing joint chambers or committees of commerce, according to the general policies of the Government,
seeking to identify export markets for Iranian products and services, 
creating a suitable entrepreneurship environment and removing business obstacles,
settling through arbitration, domestic or international commercial disputes, by establishing the ICCIMA Arbitration Center.

See also
Venture capital in Iran
Trade Promotion Organization (Iran)
Economy of Iran
Industry of Iran
Mining in Iran
Agriculture in Iran
Taxation in Iran
Iranian labor law
Foreign Direct Investment in Iran
Iran's international rankings in economy
List of major economic laws in Iran
Licensing and franchising in Iran
Ministry of Industries and Mines (Iran)
Bank of Industry and Mine

References

External links
 Iran Chamber of Commerce, Industries and Mines
 Iran Chamber of Commerce, Industries and Mines
Iraninvestment.org
History of ICCIM
Iran's Trade Promotion Organization - Affiliated to the Ministry of Commerce (Iran)
UN's Iran Trade Point Network

Dispute resolution information
Iran's Foreign Trade Regime - Document explaining all avenues  and procedures for commercial dispute resolution in Iran.
Commercial arbitration - Ministry of Commerce (Iran)

Economy of Iran
Chambers of commerce in Iran